James D. Ryan (1844 – 1925) was an Irish-born merchant and politician in Newfoundland. He represented Ferryland in the Newfoundland House of Assembly from 1900 to 1904.

He was born in Kedra, County Tipperary and educated at New Inn and Cahir. Ryan came to Newfoundland in 1866. He was employed as a clerk, working in Carbonear, Harbour Grace and St. John's. Ryan was named to the Legislative Council of Newfoundland in 1904, becoming president in 1920.

He served as president of the Benevolent Irish Society for over 25 years. He helped organize the restoration of St. Patrick's Hall after it was destroyed by fire. He also served on the board of directors for Saint Bonaventure's College. In 1919, Ryan received a papal knighthood.

References 

Members of the Newfoundland and Labrador House of Assembly
Members of the Legislative Council of Newfoundland
1844 births
1925 deaths
Irish emigrants to pre-Confederation Newfoundland
Dominion of Newfoundland politicians
Newfoundland Colony people